The 1990–91 season was Stoke City's 84th season in the Football League and 2nd in the Third Division.

Stoke City entered the 1990–91 season in the Third Division for only the second time in their history and the feeling from the supporters was that a club of Stoke's size should be able to easily gain an instant return to the second tier. However Stoke experienced their worst ever season in terms of league position as they could only muster a 14th-place finish. Alan Ball was sacked in February and his assistant Graham Paddon took over for the remainder of the season.

Season review

League
The 1990–91 season will long be remembered by Stoke supporters as the club finished in its lowest ever league position of 14th in the third tier.  Manager Alan Ball was dismissed in late February after a 4–0 defeat at Wigan Athletic with Graham Paddon filling the gap until the end of the season. The overall team performances were of a low standard with some embarrassing defeats being suffered against the likes of Shrewsbury Town, Leyton Orient, Cambridge United and Bournemouth.

It was all meant to be so different when the season started with Stoke beating Rotherham United 3–1 on the opening day which was followed by a commanding away victory at Tranmere Rovers. The club were in the top three until the start of December, but as the first half of the season came to an end Stoke's form began to suffer and after exiting the FA Cup Stoke had two awful performances against Exeter City and Preston North End and their form completely dropped off. Results briefly improved after Paddon took over, and following a victory over Mansfield Town in late March, the club were in 9th place, just three points outside the play-offs. After that win however, Stoke earned just 4 points from their last 9 matches, ending both any remaining promotion hopes and Paddon's chance of becoming permanent manager; he resigned after the season ended and returned to former club Portsmouth as a coach. Stoke had an abysmal disciplinary record this season and at times the attitude of the players on the pitch left lot to be desired. And so, despite boasting the largest supporter base and wage budget, Stoke had a season to forget in the Third Division.

FA Cup
Stoke overcame non-league Telford United in a replay but were knocked out 2–0 at Burnley in the second round.

League Cup
A dull two legs against Swansea City was finally ended with minutes remaining thanks to a goal from Tony Kelly. However Stoke were well beaten by West Ham United 5–1 on aggregate in the next round.

League Trophy
Stoke's first Football League Trophy campaign saw them fail to get out of a group containing Mansfield Town and Northampton Town.

Final league table

Results

Legend

Football League Third Division

FA Cup

League Cup

League Trophy

Friendlies

Squad statistics

References

Stoke City F.C. seasons
Stoke